"Caro" (stylized in upper case; English: "Expensive") is a song by Puerto Rican rapper Bad Bunny featuring vocals from Ricky Martin. The song was released through Rimas Entertainment, OVO Sound and Warner Bros. Records on January 23, 2019.

Music video
The video was released on January 23, 2019. The video has over 260 million views on YouTube as of April 2021. The clip begins with Bad Bunny getting a quick manicure, and after a close-up of his nails, at that moment the trap singer is replaced by a girl, Puerto Rican model Jazmyne Joy, who looks like him, even with the same haircut. During the video, she acts just like Bad Bunny.

Charts

Weekly charts

Year-end charts

Certifications

References

2018 singles
2018 songs
Bad Bunny songs
Spanish-language songs
Songs written by Ricky Martin
Songs written by Bad Bunny